Hansemann is a surname. Notable people with the surname include:

Adolph von Hansemann (1826–1903), German businessman and banker
David Hansemann (1790–1864), Prussian politician and banker
David Paul von Hansemann (1858–1920), German pathologist
Ferdinand von Hansemann (1861–1900),  Prussian landlord and politician
Johann Wilhelm Adolf Hansemann (1784–1862), German entomologist and insect dealer
Ottilie von Hansemann (1840–1919), German women's rights activist

See also 
Hansemann Mountains, is a mountain range in Papua New Guinea
Hasemann's Daughters (film), is a 1920 German silent film